Pseudoglaea was a genus of moths of the family Noctuidae, it is now considered a synonym of Mesogona

Former species
 Pseudoglaea olivata is now known as Mesogona olivata (Harvey, 1874)

References
Natural History Museum Lepidoptera genus database
Pseudoglaea at funet

Cuculliinae